The Reaction is the 12th book in the Animorphs series, written by K.A. Applegate. It is narrated by Rachel.

Plot summary
At the zoo, Rachel and Cassie witness a boy fall into the crocodile pit. Rachel jumps into the pit to rescue him. Out of sight, she acquires and morphs a crocodile, carrying the boy to safety.

At a meeting later in the barn, the Animorphs focus on their latest news: Jeremy Jason McCole, a teen heart-throb, has become a new spokesman for The Sharing. The Animorphs feared this could make many join The Sharing, and they decide to stop it from happening.

That night, Rachel suddenly finds herself morphing involuntarily into a crocodile, then directly into a fly without returning to human form, a violation of morphing "rules", and then an elephant. She meets up with her father and has him get her on the Barry and Cindy Sue Show, which McCole will be on. Rachel tells Cassie what really happened, but she tells her not to tell Jake. Cassie agrees.

The next day, the Animorphs spy on McCole's yacht to find Visser Three there. McCole tells the Visser he wants to become a Controller. Rachel suddenly finds herself involuntarily morphing into various animals, the last being a crocodile. Visser Three is alerted and morphs. The Visser is thwarted when Rachel bites him.

Back at the barn, Ax diagnoses Rachel's condition. She is allergic to crocodile DNA, explaining her involuntary morphing, which happens when she is emotionally stressed or excited. Ax tells her she needs to expel the DNA from her body, a process known as the hereth illint.  Jake pulls Rachel off the mission until she undergoes the process. She lies to him the next day, pretending that it occurred overnight.

The next day, Rachel is scheduled to be on the show. At the show, the hereth illint begins. Cassie rushes her to the bathroom, and Rachel "burps" the crocodile DNA.  However, what Ax had not told Rachel was exactly how the DNA would come out of her: in the form of the actual animal acquired.  In this case, to the girls' horror, Rachel expels a live crocodile.  As it attacks her, she morphs a bear, and Cassie morphs a squirrel. The crocodile runs onto the stage with Rachel and Cassie, causing a commotion. Ax kills the crocodile, and Rachel steps on McCole's Yeerk, killing him.

The mission to stop McCole is a success.  He retreats to Uzbekistan.

Morphs

Allusions
This story was used as an Animorphs TV episode (given the same title and using the same animal, the crocodile) but the episode had Cassie allergic to the morph rather than Rachel in the books; also, the allergy simply caused Cassie to morph randomly between her human and crocodile morph, rather than the random transformation from one morph to another that happened in the book. Also in the book Ax killed the crocodile but in the episode he didn't and ate a Yeerk.
Cassie's mom (Michelle) thinks Cassie is interested in a number of musical groups: The Fudgies, Snoopy Diggity Dog, Boys Eleven Men, and Nice Is Neat.

Reaction, The
1997 science fiction novels
1997 American novels